The Howard of Effingham School is a co-educational secondary school and sixth form with academy status. It is located in the village of Effingham, Surrey, to the west of Little Bookham. The school is part of the Howard Partnership Trust, a Multi-Academy Trust which includes four secondary and five primary schools.

The school is named after Charles Howard the second Baron Howard of Effingham of the Howard Family who was commander of the English forces during the battles against the Spanish Armada in 1588 and was chiefly responsible after Francis Drake for the victory that saved England from invasion by the Spanish Empire.

The Howard Partnership Trust is currently led by its chief executive officer, Rhona Barnfield CBE, and the school's principal is James Baker who took over from  Helen Pennington in September 2021. The school was judged in 2019 to be Good by Ofsted.

History
The school opened in 1940 and over the years has expanded to include a community sports centre, a purpose-built sixth form block and specialist science facilities which were built after the school was designated as a science college. The school was originally built for 240 pupils but this has now increased to around 1,500.

The school converted to Academy status in 2012 and is now part of the Howard Partnership Trust. The trust includes three other Surrey secondary schools (Thomas Knyvett College, Oxted School and Three Rivers Academy) and four primary schools (Kenyngton Manor Primary School, Cuddington Community Primary School, Eastwick Infant and Eastwick Junior Schools, St Lawrence Primary School) and The Howard Nursery School. Rhona Barnfield, the trust's CEO was appointed a Commander of the Order of the British Empire (CBE) CBE for services to Education in the New Years Honours of 2016.

Curriculum and academic performance
The school curriculum is based on the National Curriculum and the school has achieved notable academic success. In 2015 the school was the 30th most successful comprehensive school in the country for GCSE results according to The Daily Telegraph.

The school's most recent Ofsted inspection in December 2019 found that the school was 'Good' overall with the following breakdown;

The quality of education - Good
Behaviour and attitudes - Good
Personal development - Good
Leadership and management - Good
Sixth-form provision Outstanding

The school's previous Ofsted inspection in 2009 (prior to the school changing to Academy status) found that the school was 'Outstanding' overall with the following breakdown;

Overall effectiveness – Outstanding
Achievement and standards – Outstanding
Personal development and well-being – Outstanding
The quality of provision – Outstanding for 16–19. Good for whole school 
Leadership & management – Outstanding

House system
There is a well established House system. All students are allocated to one of the four houses when they start at the school.

The houses are named after historical figures with local links;

Cromwell (green) after Thomas Cromwell (c. 1485 – 28 July 1540), the English lawyer and statesman who was born in Putney then a part of Surrey.
Howard (red) after Charles Howard (c.1536 – 14 December 1624), the second Baron Howard of Effingham. 
Raleigh (blue) after Sir Walter Raleigh (c.1554 – 29 October 1618) the politician and explorer. Raleigh's son Carew lived in nearby West Horsley and Sir Walter's head is rumoured to be buried in the local church.
Sheridan (yellow) after Richard Brinsley Sheridan (30 October 1751 – 7 July 1816) the Irish playwright who lived at nearby Polesden Lacey.

Sport
The school has achieved some notable successes particularly in rugby union and, unusually for a school in Surrey, in rugby league.

On 5 May 2002, Howard of Effingham's year 8 boys' rugby union team won the Daily Telegraph Emerging Schools National Tournament. They played at the half time interval between the Army and Navy at Twickenham Stadium where they were easy winners and claimed the best year 8 schools rugby team 2002 title.

In August 2012, Howard of Effingham's Year 7 boys' rugby league team became the first team from the south of England to win the Carnegie Champion Schools competition, beating Castleford Academy 24-22.

Some of the school's alumni have achieved success as professional footballers. Probably the most notable is former Crystal Palace and West Ham United player John 'Johnny' Byrne. Byrne was born in West Horsley, Surrey, to Irish immigrants in May 1939. He attended Howard of Effingham in the 1950s and it was a schoolteacher Vincent Blore, himself a former footballer, who encouraged Byrne and alerted Crystal Palace of his talent.

Byrne made his debut for England in 1961 and on 16 May 1964, he memorably scored a hat-trick in Lisbon in England's 4–3 win over a Portugal team that included Eusébio.

In more recent times Conor Gallagher, who attended the school in the 2010s, made his debut for England in a World Cup qualifying match against San Marino on 14 November 2021.

Notable former pupils
 Johnny Byrne, former Crystal Palace, West Ham United and England footballer 
 Paul Donovan, economist
 Tom Felton, actor
 Emelia Gorecka, athlete
 Dan Gallagher, footballer 
 Conor Gallagher, footballer
 Alex Inglethorpe, former footballer and current Academy Director at Liverpool FC
 Jonathan R. Scott, former actor
 Kristen Spours, figure skater
 Tom Shanklin, Welsh rugby union player

References

External links 

 School website
Howard of Effingham Ofsted page
 Government Compare School Performance
 EduBase

Educational institutions established in 1940
1940 establishments in England
Secondary schools in Surrey
Academies in Surrey